Tabuk, also spelled Tabouk, is the capital city of the Tabuk Region in northwestern Saudi Arabia. It has a population of 667,000 (as of 2021). It is close to the Jordanian–Saudi Arabia border, and houses the largest air force base in Saudi Arabia.

History 
Ptolemy mentioned a place by the name 'Tabawa', at the northwestern corner of Arabia. This name may be a reference to 'Tabuka' or 'Tabuk'. If this is true, the town may be as old as Ptolemy's time. Pre-Islamic Arab poets, such as Antra and Nabiqa, mentioned its mountain 'Hasmi' in their poems.

Tabouk became famous for the Expedition to Tabuk in 630 CE, during the period of prophet Muhammad. Since then, it remained a gateway of North Arabia. It was also visited by a number of European travelers such as Doughty in 1877 and Huber in 1884.

Tabuk was captured by the Arab forces in 1918, 3 weeks after the British capture of Damascus.

Tabuk became a centre of military activity during the 1991 Gulf War as the city faced threats from Iraqi scuds and air attacks.

Archaeological or historical sites in the area 
The region is rich in antiquities and archaeological sites such as petroglyphs, inscriptions, forts, palaces, walls, Syrian-Egyptian pilgrimage route, and the remains of the Hejaz Railway line, the main station of which is located in Tabuk.

Rock art and inscriptions' site in Wadi Dam 
Hundreds of localities with Rock art and inscriptions dating to different chronological periods and ranging from Paleolithic to the Islamic period were recorded at Wadi Dam and the region west of Tabuk. Study of the art revealed rich stylistic variability and both human and animal figures were represented in it. Tens of sites in the area with Thamudic, Greek and Nabataean inscriptions have been found.

Tabuk Castle 

It is also known as the castle of Aṣ-ḥāb al-Aykah ("Companions of the Wood"), who are mentioned in the Quran. The castle dates back to about 3500 BCE and has been restored many times; the last was in 1062 AH (1652 CE). Several forts and stations were built along the Syrian pilgrimage route, from the Jordanian border to Al-Medinah to welcome the pilgrims. The fort consists of two floors built around an open courtyard with a mosque, a well, and a stairway leading to the watch towers used by the guards. Tabuk castle is considered an archaeological landmark of the region and is open to visitors.

Ain Sukkrah 
This is an ancient ‘ayn ('spring') dating to the Era of Jahiliyyah ('Ignorance'). It is said that during the expedition of Tabuk, Muhammad camped more than ten days near the spring and drank from its water.

The Prophet's Mosque in Tabuk 
It is also known as the Repentance Mosque. It was originally built with mud and roofed with palm trunk trees. It was restored in 1652. Eventually, its complete renewal was ordered by the late King Faisal ibn Abdul-Aziz, along the pattern of the Prophet's Mosque in Al-Medinah.

Demographics 
In 1950, Tabuk had a population of 12,000. By 2022
, this number had grown to 667,000.

Education 
Universities include:
 University of Tabuk
 Fahad bin Sultan University

Private schools include:
 British International School of Tabuk
 International Indian School Tabuk
 Pakistan International School of Tabuk
 Philippine International School
 King Abdulaziz Model schools
 Tabuk International School
 Bangladesh International School, Tabuk

Geography and climate

See also

 1068 Near East earthquake, catastrophic event whose epicentre was in the area of Tabuk
 Al-Hijr Archaeological Site (Hegra)
 AlUla
 Hejaz
 Hijaz Mountains

References

External links 

Tabouk - Saudi Arabia
Tabuk City on Saudi Tourism Site

 
Populated places in Tabuk Province
Provincial capitals of Saudi Arabia
Jordan–Saudi Arabia border